Samui Song is 2017 Thai noir crime thriller drama film directed and written by Pen-Ek Ratanaruang. It is his ninth feature film. The film had premiered in the "Venice Days (Giornate degli Autori)" section at the 74th Venice International Film Festival on August 30, 2017, and had a limited release in Thailand in 2018.

Plot 
Viyada or Vi (Chermarn Boonyasak), a Thai soap opera actress finds herself under the pressure of her husband, Jerome (Stephane Sednaoui), the rich foreigner who believes in a charismatic cult leader. According to this uncomfortable relationship, it has led her to a plan to kill her husband by hiring Guy Spencer (David Asavanond), a gunman who has trouble earning money to take care of his elderly invalid mother. However, when the plan is unsuccessful chaos ensues for both Viyada and Guy Spencer.

Cast 
 David Asavanond as Guy Spencer
 Chermarn Boonyasak as	Viyada (Vi)
 Karen Gemma Dodgson	as Worshiper
 Vithaya Pansringarm		
 Stephane Sednaoui as	Jerome Beaufoy
 Palika Suwannarak

Production 
Samui Song had been in the process of production since 2015 and took about 3 months on the production. However, because of the complicated plot and storylines, it took more than 1 year in the post-production. This film is a return of working between Pen-Ek Ratanaruang and Chermarn Boonyasak after they had worked together in the film Last Life in the Universe.

References 

2017 films
Films directed by Pen-Ek Ratanaruang
Thai-language films
2017 thriller drama films
Thai crime drama films
Thai thriller films
2017 crime thriller films